Mynard is an unincorporated community in Cass County, Nebraska, United States.

History
A post office was established at Mynard in 1894, which remained in operation until it was discontinued in 1939. Mynard was named for Mynard Lewis, a railroad employee.

References

Populated places in Cass County, Nebraska
Unincorporated communities in Nebraska